Channel 7 is a Burmese free-to-air television channel jointly operated by MRTV-4. It is owned by Forever Group. It launched in May 2012, the channel broadcasts between 7am and 11pm. Now, it is broadcasting in 24 hours.

Channel 7 also broadcasts foreign series with Burmese subtitles and dubbing.

Programming

Television shows
 Family Feud Myanmar 
 The Money Drop Myanmar

Television series
Flowers and Butterflies
Happy Beach

See also
 Media of Burma
 Communications in Burma
 MRTV-4
 MITV

References

External links
 

Television channels in Myanmar
Television channels and stations established in 2012
2012 establishments in Myanmar